The 2018 FA Vase Final was the 44th final of the Football Association's cup competition for teams at levels 9–11 of the English football league system. The match was contested between Stockton Town, of the Northern League Division One, and Thatcham Town, of the Hellenic League Premier Division. This was the first time both teams had reached the final and the first visit to Wembley Stadium for both sides. The final of the FA Trophy was played on the same day at the same venue for the third year running, as part of the FA's Non-League Finals Day. Both matches were televised in the UK on BT Sport.

Stockton Town began their campaign in the second qualifying round, with a victory over Consett. They proceeded to defeat Whickham, Bootle, City of Liverpool, West Auckland Town, Stourport Swifts, Windsor and Marske United en route to the final.

Thatcham Town started in the first round of the competition, where they defeated Horsham YMCA. Victories over Broadbridge Heath, Sevenoaks Town, Biggleswade, Bromsgrove Sporting, Melksham Town and 1874 Northwich saw them reach the final.

Background
The final will be the first appearance for both sides in a national cup final.

Stockton Town play their league football in the Northern League Division One, following promotion from the second division in the previous season. The 2017–18 season was their first season at level nine of the pyramid and only their third season playing in the FA Vase since their first appearance in the 1982–83 season. Their best run in the competition was reaching the second round in the 2016–17 season.

Thatcham Town play in the Hellenic League Premier Division. Thatcham won the league prior to the final on goal difference, finishing on 98 points, to earn promotion to the Southern Football League. They won thirty-one of their thirty-eight league matches, drawing five and losing just two. They embarked on a forty match unbeaten run, in all competitions, before the final - ending with a 2–1 defeat against Binfield two games before to the final. Their previous best run in the competition was a quarter-final appearance in the 1988–89 season, where they were defeated by Berkshire rivals Hungerford Town.

Route to the final

Stockton Town

Thatcham Town

Match

Details

References

2018
FA Vase Final
FA Vase Final 2018
FA Vase Final
Thatcham Town F.C.